Chillington is a village and parish in Somerset, England, situated  west of Crewkerne and  east of Chard in the South Somerset district.  The parish has a population of 164.

History

The name comes from Ceola's settlement. The parish of Chillington was part of the South Petherton Hundred. The manor passed in the mid 18th century to the Notley family who built the old manor house.

Higher Chillington was built in the 18th century around common land around Chillington Common.

Governance

The parish council has responsibility for local issues, including setting an annual precept (local rate) to cover the council's operating costs and producing annual accounts for public scrutiny. The parish council evaluates local planning applications and works with the local police, district council officers, and neighbourhood watch groups on matters of crime, security, and traffic. The parish council's role also includes initiating projects for the maintenance and repair of parish facilities, as well as consulting with the district council on the maintenance, repair, and improvement of highways, drainage, footpaths, public transport, and street cleaning. Conservation matters (including trees and listed buildings) and environmental issues are also the responsibility of the council.

The village falls within the Non-metropolitan district of South Somerset, which was formed on 1 April 1974 under the Local Government Act 1972, having previously been part of Chard Rural District. The district council is responsible for local planning and building control, local roads, council housing, environmental health, markets and fairs, refuse collection and recycling, cemeteries and crematoria, leisure services, parks, and tourism.

Somerset County Council is responsible for running the largest and most expensive local services such as education, social services, libraries, main roads, public transport, policing and fire services, trading standards, waste disposal and strategic planning.

It is also part of the Yeovil county constituency represented in the House of Commons of the Parliament of the United Kingdom. It elects one Member of Parliament (MP) by the first past the post system of election, and was part of the South West England constituency of the European Parliament prior to Britain leaving the European Union in January 2020, which elected seven MEPs using the d'Hondt method of party-list proportional representation.

Religious sites

The older part of the village was Lower Chillington which was built around the Church of St James. The church has 13th-century origins, with modifications taking place in the early 14th and in the 15th centuries. It was restored in 1842 and 1909. The two bells were made by Thomas Bilbie of the Bilbie family.

References

External links

Villages in South Somerset
Civil parishes in Somerset